Plouarzel is a commune in the Finistère department of Brittany in north-western France.

The westernmost point of continental France, the Pointe de Corsen, lies within the commune.

Population
Inhabitants of Plouarzel are called in French Plouarzélistes.

Breton language
The municipality launched a linguistic plan concerning the Breton language through Ya d'ar brezhoneg on 4 July 2005. In 2008, 9.71% of primary-school children attended bilingual schools.

See also
Communes of the Finistère department

References

External links
Official website 
Tourism Office website 

Mayors of Finistère Association 

Communes of Finistère